Bruna Papandrea  (born 1971) is an Australian film and television producer and the founder of production company Made Up Stories. Prior to Made Up Stories, Papandrea co-founded the production company Pacific Standard with Reese Witherspoon.

Early life and education
Papandrea was raised in Adelaide, South Australia, by a single mother.

Career

She moved to New York City in the 1990s after establishing a career in film production. She briefly returned to Australia to produce the 2000 film Better Than Sex, which was nominated for the AFI Award for Best Film, before moving to London in 2001. She served as a production executive at the film studio Mirage Enterprises and later returned to New York to work for GreeneStreet Films, a production company for independent films, as a creative director. At GreeneStreet she executive produced the 2006 romantic comedy Wedding Daze before joining another independent production company, Groundswell Productions, in Los Angeles in February 2006. There she was responsible for producing Smart People (2008), Milk (2008), The Marc Pease Experience (2009), and All Good Things (2010).

In 2011, Papandrea produced Warm Bodies, a zombie comedy film directed by Jonathan Levine and released in 2013.

In 2012, she and actress Reese Witherspoon co-founded Pacific Standard, a Beverly Hills-based production company focusing on creating films made by and about women. Their first two projects at Pacific Standard were Gone Girl and Wild, both adapted from books whose rights were acquired by Papandrea and Witherspoon before publication. Both films were released in 2014, by which time they had also completed production on the 2015 comedy film Hot Pursuit. In 2016, they announced that they were ending their partnership, though they would continue to work on the projects that were in the middle of production, including the HBO series Big Little Lies and a film adaptation of the novel Luckiest Girl Alive.

Papandrea launched her current production company, Made Up Stories, in January 2017 to carry on her mission in championing female filmmakers, adapting female-written novels and creating stories featuring multi-faceted female characters. The company is also committed to inclusivity in less-acknowledged departments behind-the-scenes such as transportation teams and gaffers. Papandrea has expressed intent to start a foundation, Made Up Solutions, to provide opportunities for women from low socio-economic and diverse backgrounds.

In April 2020, Papandrea and Gregg Fienberg founded the "It Takes Our Village" initiative, along with numerous A-list Hollywood producers to help raise money for below-the-line crews affected by COVID-19. Papandrea credited "below-the-line crews" as "the backbone of our industry". “They are our community – and our community is in need. This initiative is personal to me as I’m a working-class girl who grew up with unions protecting my family. I want to help provide that protection to those who are a vital part in creating stories; the stories that are providing escapism and comfort to people around the world."

Recognition 
2015: Papandrea received the Australians in Film International Award.

2018: Papandrea was honored by G'Day USA, receiving Outstanding Achievement in Film & TV Award.

2020: Papandrea won the Don Dunstan Award, and appeared "In Conversation" with one of the patrons of the Adelaide Film Festival, Margaret Pomeranz  in mid-October during the 2020 event.

2020: Papandrea was named to Variety's L.A. Women's Impact Report 2020.

2020: Papandrea was named as one of 40 Australians who mattered in Film & TV for 2020 by The Age's Good Weekend.

2021: Papandrea received the Australian Women's Film Festival (AWFF) Groundbreaker Award.

2021: Papandrea was included in The Hollywood Reporter's 2021 Women In Entertainment Power 100

2021: Papandrea was included in Deadline's DISRUPTORS 2021 class

2023: Papandrea was appointed a Member of the Order of Australia in the 2023 Australia Day Honours.

Awards & Nominations 
2000: Nominated for the Australia Film Institute (AFI) Award Best Film for Better Than Sex

2017: Winner of the Primetime Emmy for Outstanding Limited Series for Big Little Lies

2018: Winner of the Golden Globe for Best Television Series or Motion Picture Made for Television for Big Little Lies (season 1)

2018: Nominated for the BAFTA TV Award for Best International for Big Little Lies

2018: Nominated for the PGA Award for Outstanding Producer of Episode Television, Drama for Big Little Lies (season 1)

2019: Winner of the AACTA Award for Best Film for The Nightingale

2020: Winner of the Film Critics Circle of Australia Awards for Best Film for The Nightingale

2020: Nominated for the PGA Award for Outstanding Producer of Episode Television, Drama for Big Little Lies (season 2)

2020: Nominated for the Golden Globe for Best Television Series, Drama for Big Little Lies (season 2)

2021: Nominated for the Critics' Choice Television Awards for Best Limited Series for The Undoing

2021: Nominated for the Golden Globe for Best Limited Series or Television Film for The Undoing

2021: Nominated for the PGA Award's David L. Wolper Award for Outstanding Producer of Limited Series Television for The Undoing

Personal life
Papandrea is married to producer Steve Hutensky and gave birth to twins in 2012. She has systemic lupus erythematosus (lupus), diagnosed in August 2010, which causes her chronic joint pain.

Filmography 
Before she started her own production companies, Papandrea produced various films with other companies, including:
Better Than Sex (2000)
Wedding Daze (2006)
Milk (2008)
Smart People (2008)
The Marc Pease Experience (2009)
All Good Things (2010)
 Not Suitable for Children (2012)

Films

Television Series

Projects In Development 

 Film adaptation of the thriller novel As Long As We Both Shall Live by JoAnn Chaney
 Television adaption of The Lost Flowers of Alice Hart based on the debut novel from Australian writer Holly Ringland
 Adaptation of the historical epic The Lost Queen by Signe Pike for television
 TV series based on the Jessica Knoll novel The Favorite Sister
 A limited TV series on Tina Brown based on her book The Vanity Fair Diaries
 Film adaptations of the YA fantasy books Stepsister and Poisoned by Jennifer Donnelly with Lynette Howell Taylor's 51 Entertainment
 The multi-generational novel The Last Anniversary by Liane Moriarty
 TV adaption of Christina Baker Kline's new book The Exiles
 TV show based on Greer Macallister's historical thriller Woman 99 with Nina Dobrev
 TV adaption of Marie Lu's Warcross with John Cameron
 Feature film adaption of Christopher Paolini's first adult novel, the sci-fi space opera To Sleep in a Sea of Stars with Snoot Entertainment
 Universal's film adaptation of Gayle Tzemach Lemmon's novel, Ashley's War: The Untold Story of a Team of Women Soldiers on the Special Ops Battlefield
TV adaption of Elizabeth Acevedo's dual-narrative YA Novel, Clap When You Land
Film adaptation of Gordon Reece's debut novel, Mice, in partnership with Nicole Kidman's Blossom Films
Film adaptation of Erin French's memoir, Finding Freedom: A Cook's Story; Remaking Life From Scratch
TV adaptation of Kirsten Miller's upcoming novel, The Change, in partnership with Raelle Tucker

References

External links

https://michaelwest.com.au/screen-australia-awards-grant-to-former-harvey-weinstein-associate-for-gender-matters-initiative/

Living people
1971 births
Members of the Order of Australia
People from Adelaide
Australian film producers
People with lupus
Australian women film producers